Season Lao (born February 16, 1987) is a contemporary artist and photographer. He was born in Macau and is currently based in Hokkaido, Japan.

His works are mainly photos. Such subjects as the coexistence of nature and mankind, and the delicate balance between metropolis and countryside, are represented in a subtle way looking like ink-wash paintings (Suiboku-ga) by using custom handmade paper made of plant fibers.

Currently Lao presents his works mainly in East Asia, but many works have also been exhibited in Europe and America.

Representing Macau, his work has been exhibited in China's Pingyao International Photography Festival. He was also one of the artists to join the 67th Sapporo Snow Festival. One of his projects "Pateo do Mungo", which talks about the old street where he was born, was published as a photo book and documentary in Macau. The historic buildings, designated to be demolished, have been preserved. He was also selected for a special exhibition at the Daegu Art Fair 2016. His works were collected by AYA Niseko, a luxury condo hotel located in Niseko, Japan, to be permanently exhibited in the hotel rooms.

References

   アルトネ ｜ マカオを愛し、世界を旅する孤高のコスモポリタン／シーズン・ラオさんに聞く【インタビュー】 
   美術世界 MAR 2018 | 눈과 야심　시즌 라오 개인전 2.1~2.17 리서울갤러리
   FOMATS ｜ SEASON LAO Born in Macao. Season Lao began... 
   The Macau Post Daily | Artist captures silence in artwork
  서울문화투데이 | 한지에 옮겨진 훗카이도의 자연, 시즌 라오 개인전 2월 리서울갤러리, 개인전 기간 중 강원도 겨울 촬영해 작품 선보일 예정
  Hokkaido winter – Mostra personale di Season Lao
  Hokkaido winter mostra personale di Season Lao
  Hokkaido winter – Solo show by Season Lao – MAG Como
  Le gallerie MAG di Como e TOMO di Kyoto presentano la mostra personale di Season Lao HOKKAIDO WINTER a cura di Salvatore Marsiglione e Tomoharu Aoyama Inaugurazione: venerdì 19 maggio 2017 ore 18:30 20 maggio – 10 giugno 2017
  Hokkaido winter, mostra personale di Season Lao alla MAG di Como
  微信-头条易读| 【澳聞】本澳藝術家劉善恆作品再獲選韓國大邱藝博特別展
  澳門會展經濟報| 本澳藝術家劉善恆作品再獲選韓國大邱藝博特別展
   Yahoo!ニュース | マカオ出身の芸術家シーズン・ラオ氏が大阪開催の大型アートフェア「UNKNOWN ASIA」審査員に…東京やマカオで展示会も予定
   月刊ISM 2016年７月号 | 人と自然のあり方を模索　作品の精神性とアイデンティティ 芸術家・写真家 シーズン・ラオ 劉善恆さん
  Hokkaido Likers | 雪景色に魅せられマカオから北海道へ拠点を移した芸術家「シーズン・ラオ」
  澳門雜誌 第110| 劉善恆與雪國的不解緣 - 澳門雜誌 p34-39
  ponto final | “Em Macau, é fácil tornarmo-nos conhecidos. No Japão, é preciso ter talento” | 16 de Novembro de 2015
  | Macao Magazine | Macao joins Japan’s winter wonderland
  美術ぺん 147 WINTER p12 「白い雪にメッセージを託して」シーズン・ラオ 
  | HBCテレビ | ガッチャンコ・ジャーニー - マカオ編
  ASIA CONTEMPORARY ART | Season Lao
  | PHOTOINTER | PIP Festival：Photographers Work in Macau
  Hoje Macau | FOTOGRAFIA TRABALHOS DE ARTISTAS DA RAEM NA CHINA CONTINENTAL  | 22 SET 2014 #3179 by Jornal Hoje Macau - issuu
  Presenze, spaesamenti, trasfigurazioni de "L'UOMO NEL PAESAGGIO" in mostra a Como
    L'uomo nel paesaggio : Carlo Pozzoni fotoreporter
  | Macao Cultural and Creative Industries Website | 《L’UOMO NEL PAESAGGIO 》Exhibition and Book publication
  Season Lao - Pateo do Mungo 百年菉荳圍, Indústrias Criativas na Freguesia de São Lázaro, 2009, Makau – photobooks josef chladek
  KAWABA NEW-NATURE PHOTO AWARD 2014
  澳門藝術博物館 劉善恆
  香港ウンチク話 ｜ 北海道を拠点に活躍するマカオ人・劉善恆（シーズン・ラオ）さんのエキシビジョン 
  HBC北海道放送公式アカウント Twitter ｜ 【HBCマカオ広場】さっぽろ雪まつり、きょう開幕！マカオカフェも準備OK！マカオ出身で札幌の写真家シーズン・ラオさんの作品展を開催します

External links 
 Season Lao

1987 births
Chinese photographers
Living people
21st-century Macau people
Macau emigrants to Japan